Thomas S. Kidd (born 1971) is an American historian, currently a Distinguished Professor at Baylor University and Distinguished professor of Church History at Midwestern Baptist Theological Seminary. Before becoming a professor, Kidd studied at the University of Notre Dame. He is a notable historian and author of such books as George Whitefield, a biography on the 18th-century Anglo-American preacher. Kidd credits George Whitefield as being "profoundly influential on the American nation's founding."

Books

References

1971 births
21st-century American historians
21st-century American male writers
Baylor University faculty
Clemson University alumni
Historians of Christianity
Historians of the United States
Living people
University of Notre Dame alumni
American male non-fiction writers